Northwestern Ojibwe (also known as Northern Ojibwa, Ojibway, Ojibwe) is a dialect of the Ojibwe language, spoken in Ontario and Manitoba, Canada. Ojibwe is a member of the Algonquian language family.

See also
 Ojibwe dialects

Notes

External links

OLAC resources in and about the Northwestern Ojibwa language

Central Algonquian languages
Ojibwa language, Northwestern
Indigenous languages of the North American eastern woodlands
First Nations languages in Canada